Novoland: The Castle in the Sky is a 2016 Chinese television series based on an original story created by Shanghai Film Media Asia and Tencent Penguin Pictures. Set in an ancient world (Novoland) where humanity is separated into several races, the series centers on the souring relations between the Humankind Tribe and the Wingkind Tribe. It aired on Jiangsu TV from 20 July to 1 September 2016.

The series has over 1.6 billion views by the end of its run. Guan Xiaotong won the Best Actress award at the Macau International Television Festival for her performance in the series.

Synopsis
Long long ago, there lived two clans of humans - those who can fly and those who can't. The winged clan was considered more superior to the earth humans due to their flying ability and possession of flight technology. For centuries, earth humans and the winged humans battled for supremacy. After centuries of animosity, a fragile peace existed between these two clans in order to end all the deaths and losses both sides suffered during the wars.

What is the reason for the winged clan's ability to fly? It is the existence of a goddess who is reincarnated every 100 years. This goddess possesses the power to grant wings to the winged clan and the aura emitted from her powers all the flight technology. Envious of the winged clan's ability to fly, the queen of the earth humans started to plot for the re-incarnation of the goddess. The queen wished to have the reincarnated goddess under her control and to provide the power to fuel her grand plan for a sky kingdom in preparation for a war against the winged clan. As predicted, a baby girl was born and she was the reincarnation of the goddess. However, the queen missed her opportunity to kidnap the baby girl and the child grew up peacefully in anonymity, not knowing that she's the goddess reincarnate. To the humans and the winged clan, the goddess was born to grant the winged clan the ability to fly, but in reality the goddess is born every 100 years to reunite with her lover and even in this reincarnation, she was fated to meet and separate from him.

What is the fate of this pair of star-crossed lovers? Can they consummate their relationship in this reincarnation after so many centuries of missed opportunities and what of the impending war between the two clans?

Cast

Main 
Zhang Ruoyun as Feng Tianyi
The King of Wingkind Tribe. Because of his superior family background, Tianyi is spoiled and overbearing, but he slowly changes due to love. He was born to a human mother, and therefore could not grow wings.
Guan Xiaotong as Yi Fuling 
The present reincarnation of Goddess of Shooting Stars Flower Fairy. She is innocent and kind. She would sacrifice herself for others, because she doesn't want to see others suffer. 
Liu Chang as Bai Tingjun 
Crown Prince of the Humankind Tribe. He is Fuling's childhood friend and loves her deeply, but could not be together with her due to a curse placed on him by Fuling's father when he was young.
Ju Jingyi as Xue Feishuang 
Xue Clan's princess, and Tianyi's childhood friend. She is noble, elegant and beautiful, but becomes manipulative due to love. 
Chen Ruoxuan as Yu Huanzheng 
Xue Feishuang's half-brother. A talented guy who is obsessed with traps and mechanisms.

Supporting

Wingkind Tribe
Zhang Luyi as Ji Shu
Wingkind Tribe's traps/mechanisms master. He loved Bai Xue, but had to leave her due to the differences in their race.
Liu Junxiao as Xue Lin 
Xue Feishuang's brother; an important minister of Wingkind Tribe. Using his position, he abuses his authority and power. He plans to assassinate Feng Tianyi and usurp the throne, but his plans were foiled. 
Jia Zhengyu as Xiang Congling
A member of Wingkind Tribe's Elite Team. He has a crush on Xue Feishuang.
Wei Yankan as Yue Yunqi 
A member of Wingkind Tribe's Elite Team. A loyal friend to both Feng Tianyi and Xue Feishuang.
Zhao Jian as Feng Ren 
Feng Tianyi's uncle. The regent of Wingkind Tribe.
Zhou Yifan as Yu Tongmu 
A member of Wingkind Tribe's Elite Team.
Wang Siyao as Du Ruofei
A member of Wingkind Tribe's Elite Team.
Dai Chao as Pei Yu  
Guard of Feng Ren.
Gao Feng as Xue Zhong, housekeeper of Xue family. 
Luo Youyue as Xue Qian
Li Jing as Xue Su, officer.
??? as Qiu Ting, doctor of Wingkind Tribe .

Humankind Tribe
Liu Min as Bai Xue 
Queen of the Human Tribe, Bai Tingjun's mother. She loved Ji Shu deeply, and becomes vengeful after he left with her attendant, Rui Zhu. 
Zhu Shengyi as Bi Anhua 
A female attendant who is in love with Bai Tingjun.
Aliya as Xiong Tang 
A capable and loyal warrior who serves Bai Xue.
Yang Chengjin as Yi Qianji 
Fuling's father. His actual identity is Ji Shu in disguise.
Tang Jingmei as Lin Ruizhu 
Fu Ling's mother. She was Bai Xue's attendant, but left with Ji Shu and married him. She was later killed by Bai Xue after giving birth to Fuling. 
Li Guo as Qi Luolin 
Wang Yujing as Fang Yeyan
Bai Tingjun's guard.

Stars Court  
Wen Jiang as Xing Guxuan  
Elder of Stars Court; Ji Shu's teacher.
Cui Peng as Xing Yinchi
Chief of Stars Court. 
Ma Qiguang as Xing Yufei
Instructor of Stars Court.

Heaven's Secret Door Descendents
Han Qing as Tian Yazi 
Tian Jizi's younger brother. He was removed from the sect due to practicing demonic arts. He becomes the Human Tribe's State Master after Bai Tingjun ascended the throne.
Yan Junlin as Tian Jizi, Shuang City State Master 
Guo Peini as Gu Shenghua

Others 
Lin Jieni as Shao Wu 
Goddess of Shooting Stars Flower Fairy. She loves Pian Yu.
Ji Xiaobing as Pian Yu 
Chief of the Human Tribe. He loves Shao Wu.
Wang Jun as Da Jisi (Priest)
Cheng Cheng as Xue Jin

Soundtrack

Awards and nominations

International broadcast

References

Chinese romance television series
Chinese fantasy television series
2016 Chinese television series debuts
Jiangsu Television original programming
Mandarin-language television shows
Novoland
Television series by Tencent Penguin Pictures